Brandt Newell Snedeker (born December 8, 1980) is an American professional golfer who plays on the PGA Tour. He won the 2012 FedEx Cup with a victory in the season-ending Tour Championship at East Lake Golf Club. After this victory, he moved into the top ten of the Official World Golf Ranking for the first time in his career. In February 2013, after winning the AT&T Pebble Beach National Pro-Am, he moved to a career high of number four in the world. On August 16, 2018, he shot the tenth sub-60 round in the history of the PGA Tour, firing an opening round 59 at the Wyndham Championship.

Early years and college
Snedeker was born in Nashville, Tennessee to Larry and Candice Snedeker. He was introduced to golf by his maternal grandmother, who managed a golf course in West Plains, Missouri. He attended Harding Academy, Montgomery Bell Academy and then Vanderbilt University, where he was initiated into Kappa Alpha Order by the Chi Chapter. He won the U.S. Amateur Public Links in 2003 before turning professional in 2004.

Professional career

2004–06: On the Nationwide Tour
Snedeker played on the Nationwide Tour from 2004 until 2006, when he finished 9th on the tour money list after victories at the Showdown at Somerby and the Permian Basin Charity Golf Classic, thus earning a PGA Tour spot for 2007. While on the Nationwide Tour, Snedeker recorded two wins, two runners-up, 12 tops 10s and earned $549,564.

2007: PGA Tour Rookie of the Year
Snedeker garnered immediate attention in January 2007 after shooting a course record equaling 61 in the first round of the Buick Invitational. He led the tournament by three strokes after 36 holes but due to a 74 in the third round he finished in third place. He made eight consecutive cuts starting at the Bob Hope Chrysler Classic in January and ending at the Arnold Palmer Invitational in March. In that span he recorded three top-25 finishes. In four tournaments in April, he made two cuts including a finish of T16 at the Verizon Heritage. From May to early June, Snedeker made the cut in two of the four tournaments he entered, including a T12 finish at the prestigious Players Championship.

Snedeker then went on a hot streak starting at the Stanford St. Jude Championship on June 10. He finished in a tie for fifth at that tournament and by doing so surpassed $1 million in earnings on tour in 2007. He finished in a tie for 23rd at the U.S. Open the following week. In early July he recorded two top-10 finishes, including a tie for 10th at the Buick Open. This finish put Snedeker into the top 100 of the Official World Golf Ranking for the first time.

Later in July, Snedeker finished in a tie for 7th at the Canadian Open. A fortnight later he played in the PGA Championship for the first time and finished in a tie for 18th place. Snedeker picked up his first PGA Tour victory the next week at the Wyndham Championship in North Carolina. This win propelled him to a world ranking of 55th. The Wyndham Championship was the last regular season event before the FedEx Cup Playoffs. Snedeker entered the playoffs in 9th place in the point standings. He played in all four playoff events, recording finishes of missed cut, T47, T14 and T29. Snedeker finished in 20th place in the final points standings, which earned him a bonus check of $225,000.

Due to his fine debut performance on tour, Snedeker was named the PGA Tour Rookie of the Year for 2007. He entered 29 PGA Tour events in 2007, making 23 cuts. He had one win, a third-place finish, six top-10 finishes and 13 top-25 finishes. He earned $2,836,643 which put him in 17th on the final money list and he finished 2007 ranked 47th in the world rankings.

2008–10
Snedeker began the 2008 season with a tied for 10th finish at the Mercedes-Benz Championship. He finished tied for 9th at the FBR Open in February and tied for 8th at the PODS Championship in March. Snedeker recorded his first top-10 in a major at the 2008 Masters, where he finished tied for third. He went into the final round in second place, two strokes behind eventual winner Trevor Immelman but Snedeker shot a final round 77. Following his third-place finish at the 2008 Masters Tournament, Snedeker reached a new high of 32nd in the world rankings. Snedeker finished in the top-10 for the second time in a major at the 2008 U.S. Open where he finished tied for 9th. For the rest of the year Snedeker struggled to maintain his early season consistency and did not record another top-10 finish for the season. Snedeker made 19 of 26 cuts on the year and recorded five top-10s, seven top-25s and earned $1,531,442 while finishing 34th in the FedEx Cup standings.

Snedeker struggled in 2009, making only 14 of 26 cuts and failing to make the cut in 9 of his first 12 tournaments. His play improved in the summer as he had two consecutive top-5 finishes, a tie for 5th place at the AT&T National, and a tie for 2nd place at the John Deere Classic. These were followed by two more top-5 finishes at the RBC Canadian Open and the Wyndham Championship. Despite this mid season form he missed the cut in all four of the years majors. One factor contributing to Snedeker's uneven play in 2009 was his health. He missed seven consecutive tournaments in the middle of the season due to a rib injury. Snedeker finished the season 55th on the money list.

Snedeker started the 2010 season well with a top-10 finish at the Bob Hope Classic which he then followed up with a runner-up finish at the Farmers Insurance Open. Snedeker played consistently throughout the early season making eight consecutive cuts through to April. However he then missed five of his next seven cuts and did not record a single top-25 finish until the U.S. Open where Snedeker finished in a tie for 8th place at Pebble Beach Golf Links, his best ever finish in the U.S. Open. For the rest of season he played steadily and recorded two more top-10s at the Wyndham Championship and the end of season playoff event the Deutsche Bank Championship. Snedeker ended the year 48th on the money list.

2011
Snedeker had an inconsistent start to the 2011 season missing his first cut at the Bob Hope Classic, but followed that up with two consecutive top-10 finishes at the Farmers Insurance Open and the Waste Management Phoenix Open. This was then followed by a further two missed cuts and a withdrawal from the Honda Classic to attend the birth of his first child. He returned to the tour with a 4th-place finish at the Transitions Championship and then at the year's first major championship, the Masters Tournament finished in a tie for 15th. The following week Snedeker had a chance to win his second PGA Tour title at the Valero Texas Open but made a number of mistakes on the back nine on Sunday which cost him victory, eventually finishing alone in 4th.

Snedeker won his second PGA Tour title at The Heritage, beating Luke Donald in a sudden-death playoff at the third extra hole. Snedeker shot a seven-under-par round of 64 to recover from six shots back on the Sunday to tie Donald. The first two extra holes were parred by both players, but when Donald's par chip missed on the third extra hole, Snedeker sealed the win. This victory took Snedeker to 38th in the world rankings. In November 2011, Snedeker underwent elective surgery on his right hip in order to fix a degenerative issue. This sidelined him for six to eight weeks at the end of year, however Snedeker confirmed he wished to have surgery at this stage in order to be fully fit for the 2012 season. Snedeker finished the season 14th on the money list.

2012
Snedeker won his third PGA Tour title at the Farmers Insurance Open at Torrey Pines. He started the day seven shots behind the leader Kyle Stanley, but after firing a final round 67 he was the leader in the clubhouse while the final group completed its rounds. Stanley had a three stroke lead coming to the final hole, but pitched his third shot into the water resulting in a triple bogey 8 to take the tournament to a playoff. After both players made birdie on the first extra hole, Snedeker prevailed with an up-and-down for par on the second hole after Stanley missed his par putt. Snedeker entered the top 20 in the Official World Golf Ranking after his win. Snedeker had to withdraw from the 2012 U.S. Open due to a rib injury.

During a practice round for the 2012 Open Championship, Snedeker holed a driver from the tee on the 16th hole, a 336-yard par 4. In the championship itself, he scored 66 and 64 in the first two rounds to equal the lowest 36 hole score in the tournament by Nick Faldo in 1992. Snedeker finished with rounds of 73 and 74 to share 3rd place with Tiger Woods at three under par, four shots behind the winner, Ernie Els

Snedeker won the 2012 FedEx Cup and the $10 million prize after winning the Tour Championship.

2013
Snedeker began his 2013 season with three top-3 finishes in his first four tournaments: third at the Hyundai Tournament of Champions, tied for second at the Farmers Insurance Open, and solo second at the Waste Management Phoenix Open. He then won in his fifth start of the year, the AT&T Pebble Beach National Pro-Am and moved up to a career-high 4th in the Official World Golf Ranking. He pulled out of the WGC-Accenture Match Play Championship the following week, citing a rib injury. He was later diagnosed with "low bone turnover" and began taking daily injections to increase his bone mass. He had top-10 finishes at the Masters Tournament (T-6), the Players Championship (T-8), and the AT&T National (T-8), before winning his second tournament of the season at the RBC Canadian Open. Snedeker spent the entire 2013 PGA Tour season inside the top 10 of the World Golf Rankings.

2014
Snedeker had only three top-10 finishes on the tour in 2014, with a best finish of T-5 at the Wyndham Championship. He finished 86th on the FedEx Cup points list and 60th on the money list.

2015
After a winless  2014 including many missed cut and rare top-ten finishes, Snedeker worked in the off-season with his coach Butch Harmon to find new sensation in his swing and especially new mental strength. This hard work finally paid off at the AT&T Pebble Beach National Pro-Am, where Snedeker won for the second time in three years with the score of −22, three strokes ahead of Nick Watney. This was the seventh PGA Tour title for Snedeker and the victory lifted him back in the top 50 in the World Ranking.

Snedeker was back to his consistent ways in the 2015 PGA Tour season with frequent places in the top-10 of events. Three ties for 10th occurred early in the season at the Shriners Hospitals for Children Open, WGC-HSBC Champions, and the Waste Management Phoenix Open. After missing the cut at both the 2015 Masters Tournament and The Players Championship, Snedeker, finished tied for 2nd at the Crowne Plaza Invitational at Colonial, tied for 6th at the AT&T Byron Nelson and solo 8th at the U.S. Open at Chambers Bay.

2018
Snedeker shot 59 in the first round of the Wyndham Championship, becoming the 10th player in the history of the PGA Tour to post a sub-60 round in competition. He went on to win the tournament, posting a total score of 259, 21 under par.

Personal life
Snedeker resides in Nashville with his wife Mandy and his children Lily and Austin who were born in 2011 and 2012. He used to work with instructor Butch Harmon.

His brother, Haymes Snedeker, won The Big Break X: Michigan, and earned a shot at Q school and the PGA Tour.

Amateur wins (1)
2003 U.S. Amateur Public Links

Professional wins (13)

PGA Tour wins (9)

PGA Tour playoff record (2–2)

European Tour wins (1)

1Co-sanctioned by the PGA Tour of Australasia

Nationwide Tour wins (2)

Nationwide Tour playoff record (2–1)

Other wins (1)

Other playoff record (0–1)

Results in major championships
Results not in chronological order in 2020.

CUT = missed the half-way cut
"T" = tied
NT = No tournament due to COVID-19 pandemic

Summary

Most consecutive cuts made – 8 (2013 Masters – 2014 PGA)
Longest streak of top-10s – 2 (2008 Masters – 2008 U.S. Open)

Results in The Players Championship

CUT = missed the halfway cut
"T" indicates a tie for a place
C = Canceled after the first round due to the COVID-19 pandemic

Results in World Golf Championships
Results not in chronological order prior to 2015.

1Cancelled due to COVID-19 pandemic

QF, R16, R32, R64 = Round in which player lost in match play
NT = no tournament
"T" = tied
Note that the HSBC Champions did not become a WGC event until 2009.

PGA Tour career summary

* As of the 2020 season.

U.S. national team appearances
Amateur
Palmer Cup: 2003

Professional
World Cup: 2008
Ryder Cup: 2012, 2016 (winners)
Presidents Cup: 2013 (winners)

See also
List of golfers with most PGA Tour wins
2006 Nationwide Tour graduates
Lowest rounds of golf

References

External links

American male golfers
Vanderbilt Commodores men's golfers
PGA Tour golfers
Ryder Cup competitors for the United States
Korn Ferry Tour graduates
Golfers from Tennessee
Sportspeople from Nashville, Tennessee
1980 births
Living people